The 1948 Pittsburgh Panthers football team represented the University of Pittsburgh in the 1948 college football season.  The team compiled a 6–3 record under head coach Mike Milligan.

Schedule

References

Pittsburgh
Pittsburgh Panthers football seasons
Pittsburgh Panthers football